Prostanthera lanceolata is a species of flowering plant in the family Lamiaceae and is endemic to near-coastal area of eastern Australia. It is an erect, aromatic shrub that has stems that are square in cross-section, glandular, egg-shaped leaves and mauve or deep bluish-purple flowers.

Description
Flowering occurs in spring. This species is included in Prostanthera ovalifolia in Queensland.

Taxonomy
Prostanthera lanceolata was first formally described in 1928 by Karel Domin in Bibliotheca Botanica from material he collected near the "Tambourine Mountains" in 1910.

Distribution and habitat
This mintbush grows in forest in near-coastal areas of New South Wales and Queensland.

References

lanceolata
Flora of New South Wales
Flora of Queensland
Lamiales of Australia
Plants described in 1997
Taxa named by Karel Domin